Iliffe may mean:

People
Baron Iliffe, of Yattendon in the County of Berkshire, a title in the Peerage of the United Kingdom
Edward Iliffe, 1st Baron Iliffe
Jim Iliffe (23 April 1922 – 25 June 2005), an Australian radio and television personality
John Iliffe (disambiguation), several people
Langton Iliffe, 2nd Baron Iliffe
Marc Iliffe (27 June 1972 – 11 February 2003) was a British strongman famous for being the winner of Britain's Strongest Man contest in 2002
Valentina Iliffe (born 17 February 1956 in Sydney, Australia), a British former alpine skier who competed in the Winter Olympics

Companies
Yattendon Group, owned by the Iliffe family

Other
Iliffe vector, In computer programming, a data structure used to implement multi-dimensional arrays